General elections were due to be held in Sark on 14 December 2022. However, only 5 candidates were nominated for the 9 seats available in the Chief Pleas, meaning that all were elected unopposed for a four-year term, without a public vote being required.

Results 
Only 5 candidates vied and were elected unopposed for the 9 available seats, meaning a by-election is due to take place in March 2023 to fill the 4 vacant seats.

Jolie Claire Booth
John David Guille
Christopher Kennedy-Barnard
Andrew Henry Benedict Miller
Helen Mildred Plummer

References

Sark
2022 in Guernsey
Elections in Sark
Uncontested elections
Non-partisan elections
Sark